The Assayer was a book published in Rome by Galileo Galilei in October 1623 and is generally considered to be one of the pioneering works of the scientific method, first broaching the idea that the book of nature is to be read with mathematical tools rather than those of scholastic philosophy, as generally held at the time.

Grassi on the comets
The context of the essay was to reply to the treatise Libra astronomica ac philosophica of 1619 by Orazio Grassi, a Jesuit mathematician at the Collegio Romano, which used the pseudonym of Lotario Sarsi Sigensano. The debate between Galileo and Grassi started in 1618, when the latter published Disputatio astronomica de tribus cometis anni MDCXVIII, in which he asserted that comets are celestial bodies. Grassi adopted Tycho Brahe's Tychonic system, in which the other planets of the Solar System orbit around the Sun, which, in turn, orbits around the Earth. In his Disputatio Grassi referenced many of Galileo's observations, such as the surface of the Moon and the phases of Venus, without mentioning him. Grassi argued from the apparent absence of observable parallax that comets move beyond the Moon. Galileo never explicitly stated that comets are an illusion, but merely wondered if they are real or an optical illusion.

Science, mathematics, and philosophy
In 1616 Galileo may have been silenced on Copernicanism. In 1623 his supporter and friend, Cardinal Maffeo Barberini, a former patron of the Accademia dei Lincei and uncle of future Cardinal Francesco Barberini, became Pope Urban VIII. The election of Barberini seemed to assure Galileo of support at the highest level in the Church. A visit to Rome confirmed this. The Assayer is a milestone in the history of science: here Galileo describes the scientific method, which was quite a revolution at the time.

The title page of The Assayer shows the crest of the Barberini family, featuring three busy bees. In The Assayer, Galileo weighs the astronomical views of a Jesuit, Orazio Grassi, and finds them wanting. The book was dedicated to the new pope. The title page also shows that Urban VIII employed a member of the Lynx, Cesarini, at a high level in the papal service. This book was edited and published by members of the Lynx.

Furthermore, he insisted that natural philosophy (i.e. physics) should be mathematical. According to the title page, he was the philosopher (i.e. physicist) of the Grand Duke of Tuscany, not merely the mathematician. Natural philosophy (physics) spans the gamut from processes of generation and growth (represented by a plant) to the physical structure of the universe, represented by the cosmic cross-section. Mathematics, on the other hand, is symbolized by telescopes, and an astrolabe. This is the book containing Galileo’s famous statement that mathematics is the language of science. Only through mathematics can one achieve lasting truth in physics. Those who neglect mathematics wander endlessly in a dark labyrinth. From the book:

Galileo used a sarcastic and witty tone throughout the essay. The book was read with delight at the dinner table by Urban VIII. In 1620 Maffeo Barberini wrote a poem entitled Adulatio Perniciosa in Galileo's honor. An official, Giovanni di Guevara, said that The Assayer was free from any unorthodoxy.

Also in the book, Galileo theorizes that senses such as smell and taste are made possible by the release of tiny particles from their host substances, which was correct but not proven until later.

See also
 Book of Nature

References

Sources
Galileo Galilei, Il Saggiatore (in Italian) (Rome, 1623); The Assayer, English trans. Stillman Drake and C. D. O'Malley, in The Controversy on the Comets of 1618 (University of Pennsylvania Press, 1960).
Pietro Redondi, Galileo eretico, 1983; Galileo: Heretic (transl: Raymond Rosenthal) Princeton University Press 1987 (reprint 1989 ); Penguin 1988 (reprint 1990 )

External links
PDF version of the abridged text of The Assayer - Stanford University
 Galileo, Selections from The Assayer - Princeton University

1623 books
Astronomy books
History of astronomy
Books by Galileo Galilei